Janė Narvilienė (20 September 1945 – 3 February 2022) was a Lithuanian politician. A member of the Social Democratic Party of Lithuania, she served in the Seimas from 2000 to 2004. She died in Kretinga on 3 February 2022, at the age of 76.

References

1945 births
2022 deaths
New Democracy Party (Lithuania) politicians
Social Democratic Party of Lithuania politicians
Members of the Seimas
21st-century Lithuanian politicians
21st-century Lithuanian women politicians
People from Ignalina District Municipality
Women members of the Seimas